Charles Tyner (June 8, 1923 – November 8, 2017) was an American film, television and stage character actor best known, principally, for his performances in the films Harold and Maude (1971), Emperor of the North Pole (1973), The Longest Yard (1974), Planes, Trains and Automobiles (1987) and Pulse (1988).

Early years
Tyner was a native of Danville, Virginia and served in the United States Army as a combat infantryman in Germany and France during World War II.

Career
In 1957, Tyner made his debut on Broadway in Orpheus Descending. Two years later, he appeared with Paul Newman in Sweet Bird of Youth on Broadway.

During 1959, Tyner made his film debut with an uncredited part in That Kind of Woman. He worked with Newman again in 1967 as Boss Higgins, the sadistic prison guard in Cool Hand Luke and became a regular character actor, appearing in films such as The Reivers, Lawman, Harold and Maude, The Cowboys, The Outlaw Josey Wales, and Emperor of the North Pole. One of his better known roles was opposite Burt Reynolds in the 1974 prison comedy The Longest Yard. Other roles include the evil Howard Rodman in the television series Father Murphy and Gus, the motel owner in Planes, Trains and Automobiles.

Tyner returned to the stage in 1977 but continued to appear in films, as well as frequently on television. Tyner's last onscreen appearance was in the 2014 independent short film Lucidia. He died on November 8, 2017.

Selected filmography

That Kind of Woman (1959) - Young Sharecropper, Father (uncredited)
Fail Safe (1964) - Jet Fighter Pilot (voice, uncredited)
Lilith (1964) - Patient (uncredited)
Cool Hand Luke (1967) - Boss Higgins
The Stalking Moon (1968) - Dace
Gaily, Gaily (1969) - Dr. Lazarus
The Reivers (1969) - Edmonds
The Cheyenne Social Club (1970) - Charlie Bannister
The Moonshine War (1970) - Mr. McClendon
The Traveling Executioner (1970) - Virgil
Monte Walsh (1970) - Doctor
Sometimes a Great Notion (1970) - Les Gibbons
Lawman (1971) - Minister
Harold and Maude (1971) - Uncle Victor
The Cowboys (1972) - Stonemason
Jeremiah Johnson (1972) - Robidoux
Fuzz (1972) - Pete Schroeder
Bad Company (1972) - Egg Farmer
Emperor of the North Pole (aka Emperor of the North) (1973) - Cracker
The Stone Killer (1973) - Police Psychiatrist
The Midnight Man (1974) - Ewing
The Longest Yard (1974) - Unger
Family Plot (1976) - Wheeler
The Outlaw Josey Wales (1976) - Zukie Limmer
Pete's Dragon (1977) - Merle Gogan
The Incredible Journey of Doctor Meg Laurel (1979) - Doug Slocumb
Evilspeak (1981) - Colonel Kincaid
The Incredible Hulk (1979-1982) - Roy Darnell
Hamburger: The Motion Picture (1986) - Lyman Vunk
Best Seller (1987) - Cleve's Father 
Planes, Trains and Automobiles (1987) - Gus Mooney
Pulse (1988) - Old Man
Enid Is Sleeping (1990) - Man at Indian Burial Site
Pastime (1990) - Arnold
Motorama (1991) - Dying Man
Lucidia (2014) - Father Gordon (final film role)

References

External links 

1925 births
2017 deaths
20th-century American male actors
21st-century American male actors
American male film actors
American male stage actors
American male television actors
Male actors from Virginia
People from Danville, Virginia
United States Army personnel of World War II
United States Army soldiers